Creative Arts Morgan Village Academy (CAMVA) is a seven-year magnet public middle / high school that focuses on fine and performing arts programs in addition to academic programming for students in seventh through twelfth grades in the City of Camden, in Camden County, New Jersey, United States, operating as part of the Camden City Public Schools. The school opened in 1999 with a freshman class of under 50 students, as one of three magnet schools in Camden, along with Brimm Medical Arts High School and MetEast High School. As of 2011, the academy added a middle school program for grades 6-8. Camden residents entering sixth or ninth grades are eligible to apply and must demonstrate interest in a particular field of the arts as well as meet minimum grade and attendance standards. Admission is based on a combination of criteria including auditions, academic scores and interviews.

As of the 2021–22 school year, the school had an enrollment of 198 students and 32.5 classroom teachers (on an FTE basis), for a student–teacher ratio of 6.1:1. There were 129 students (65.2% of enrollment) eligible for free lunch and 1 (0.5% of students) eligible for reduced-cost lunch.

Awards, recognition and rankings
Creative and Performing Arts High School was selected by U.S. News & World Report as a Bronze Medal school winner in its ranking of "Best High Schools 2008".

The school was the 180th-ranked public high school in New Jersey out of 328 schools statewide in New Jersey Monthly magazine's September 2012 cover story on the state's "Top Public High Schools", after being ranked 117th in 2010 out of 322 schools listed. The magazine ranked the school 196th in 2008 out of 316 schools. The school was ranked 187th in the magazine's September 2006 issue, which surveyed 316 schools across the state.

Extracurricular activities 
Creative Arts does not offer its own athletic programs, but students are still able to participate in athletics as part of the teams of Camden High School and Woodrow Wilson High School.

The Creative Arts Jazz Band and Vocal Ensemble are award-winning as well. The Vocal department traveled to Puerto Rico, Italy, California, New Orleans, Poland, and Nashville where they have won supreme, and gold rating. The Jazz Band has won consistently at the Berklee College of Music Jazz Festival, and has won first place in the state in 2006, 2008, 2013, and 2014.

Screening process 
Each year around May, about 100 students are chosen out of the applicants to audition for the school. Out of those 100, around 40 students are chosen. These students are chosen based on their elementary school academic record, a test taken during the audition process, and their overall audition in the fields of Instrumental and Vocal music, Dramatics, Creative Writing, Visual Arts, Dance, and Costume Design.

Administration
Core members of the school's administration are:
Dr. Davida L. Coe-Brockington

References

External links 
Creative Arts Morgan Village Academy Web Site
Camden City Public Schools

School Data for the Camden City Public Schools, National Center for Education Statistics

1999 establishments in New Jersey
Buildings and structures in Camden, New Jersey
Educational institutions established in 1999
High schools in Camden, New Jersey
Magnet schools in New Jersey
Public high schools in Camden County, New Jersey
Public middle schools in New Jersey